Nasser Ibrahim Al-Rashid (born 1939) is a Saudi businessman and US dollar billionaire. He is not included in the Forbes list of the world's richest people as his personal wealth cannot be assessed with much accuracy from publicly available information.

Al-Rashid completed his B.S. at the University of Texas in 1965, and his PhD at the university in 1970. He has since remained a prominent donor to the University of Texas, and has been honoured by the university at its Distinguished Alumnus Awards ceremony. The Dr Nasser Ibrahim Al-Rashid Strength and Training Center at the university is named in his honour. He is also a large donor to the University of Miami (FL) and its medical school. He owns one of the largest yachts in the world, the Lady Moura, which reportedly cost over US$200M to build in the late 1980s. In March 1987 Al-Rashid was one of the guests at a state banquet hosted by Queen Elizabeth II for King Fahd at Buckingham Palace.

His previous wife, Mouna Ayoub, a Lebanese woman, is considered to be a French socialite. Ayoub subsequently wrote a memoir of their marriage, La vérité (The Truth), in which Nasser Ibrahim Al-Rashid is referred to as "Amir al-Tharik". In the memoir Ayoub likened her marriage to a "...a gilded cage where I felt myself to be unjustly treated and powerless...I was given the most sumptuous dresses and amassed a huge collection of jewels, yet I could only wear my black Arab robe and a veil. I was forbidden to speak to men, forbidden to see female friends not approved by my husband, forbidden to play sport, forbidden to laugh, or speak loudly in public." Al-Rashid and his eldest son with Ayoub subsequently sued the publishers of the memoir in the French courts to try and stop publication of the memoir, alleging a breach of their privacy.

He is currently divorced. Not much is known publicly of al-Rashid, who prior to taking delivery of his yacht, maintained a relatively low profile among the wealthy Saudi elite.

Nasser Ibrahim Al-Rashid was one of three Saudi Arabian businessmen to donate over $US1 million to the Clinton Presidential Center.

Trivia
On Saturday 19 May 2007, one of his yachts, Lady Moura, nearly ran aground by the Cannes coastline during the film festival, where it suffered  hull damage and took on water. It was moored in Monaco. On 2 February 2010 Lady Moura was moored in Palma, Majorca, however it has since been repaired and is now been a prominent feature of the Alicante seaport.

References

External links
Profile in the University of Texas website

20th-century Saudi Arabian businesspeople
21st-century Saudi Arabian businesspeople
1939 births
Living people
Saudi Arabian billionaires
University of Texas alumni